The Carlton Centre is a 50-storey skyscraper and shopping centre located on Commissioner Street in central Johannesburg, South Africa. At , it is the fourth tallest building in Africa after The Leonardo (also in Johannesburg), the Mohammed VI Tower in Morocco and the Iconic Tower in Egypt. The building houses both offices and shops, and has over 46 per cent of the floor area below ground level.

The Carlton Centre is linked to the Carlton Hotel by a below-ground shopping centre with over 180 shops.

History

Design and construction
The Carlton Centre was designed by the US architectural firm Skidmore, Owings and Merrill. Anglo American Properties began construction in the late 1960s by demolishing the old Carlton Hotel and the closing roads to form a city superblock. Excavations for the Carlton began in January 1967, and took two years to complete.  Original department store anchors of the two shopping levels, Garlick's and OK Bazaars. Although occupation of the centre began in 1971, construction was not finally completed until 1974. The building officially opened in 1973 at a total cost of over R88 million. The design of the tower is very similar to that of One Seneca Tower in Buffalo, New York, completed in 1973.

Use
The building is the head office of transport parastatal Transnet, who purchased it in 1999 from Anglo American Properties (Amprop).  In June 2007, then Transnet group chief executive Maria Ramos revealed the company's intention to offer the building for sale. The Carlton Centre had served as Transnet's headquarters since 2000; it had also been the headquarters of AECI in the 1980s and 1990s before the city's urban decay began, after the parastatal purchased it for R33 million from Anglo American Properties. The disposal of the property forms part of Transnet's restructuring programme, which includes the disposal of non-core assets.  Due to the economic downturn that began in 2008, the parastatal announced it would not seek a buyer until markets recovered.

Although Transnet has given no indication of the price, the replacement cost of the building has been estimated at R1.5 billion.

The centre, after being almost empty, now has 93 percent occupancy of its office space and retail occupancy of 65 percent. Pick n Pay plans to take 3,000 square metres in the centre and the South African Revenue Service has moved from Rissik Street to its premises of 5,000 square metres in the centre. While there have been proposals to reinstate the Carlton Hotel at some stage, no official announcements to this end have been made.

Other information
The 50th and topmost floor of the Carlton Centre was called the Carlton Panorama and is known colloquially as the "Top of Africa". Once the tallest building in the Southern Hemisphere, the Carlton Centre opened with the 5-star and 30-storey Carlton Hotel taking up most of the floor space of the complex. The hotel was popular among the rich and famous, hosting many famous guests over the years. Urban decay in the inner city during the 1990s affected the hotel, which ceased operations in 1998 after nearly 25 years of operation.

Gallery

See also
 List of tallest buildings in South Africa
 List of tallest buildings in Africa

References

Carlton Center/Johannesburg/50floors/223m (730 ft) - SkyscraperPage Forum

Office buildings completed in 1973
Shopping centres in Johannesburg
Skidmore, Owings & Merrill buildings
1973 establishments in South Africa
Skyscraper office buildings in Johannesburg
20th-century architecture in South Africa